Antonio Castillo or Tony Castillo may refer to:

Creative arts personalities
Antonio del Castillo y Saavedra (1616–1668), Spanish Baroque painter, sculptor, and poet
Antonio Castillo Lastrucci (1882–1967), Spanish Andalusian religious sculptor
Antonio Martínez del Castillo (1894–1962), Spanish film director 
Antonio Castillo (costume designer) (1908–1984), Spanish wardrobe supervisor
Tony "Gorilla Tek" Castillo (born 1976), American record producer and composer

Political figures
Antonio Cánovas del Castillo (1828–1897), Spanish Prime Minister
Antonio Nava Castillo (1905–1983), Mexican polo player and politician

Sports competitors
Tony Castillo (catcher) (born June 1957), American baseball catcher
Tony Castillo (pitcher) (born 1963), Venezuela-born American relief pitcher 
Antonio Salazar Castillo (born 1989), Mexican footballer

Fictional characters
Antonio Castillo, protagonist in film Dos Corazones y un Cielo

See also
Castillo (surname)